The Netherlands women's national under-19 volleyball team represents Netherlands in international women's volleyball competitions and friendly matches under the age 19 and it is ruled by the Dutch Volleyball Association That is an affiliate of Federation of International Volleyball FIVB and also a part of European Volleyball Confederation CEV.

History

Results

Summer Youth Olympics
 Champions   Runners up   Third place   Fourth place

FIVB U19 World Championship
 Champions   Runners up   Third place   Fourth place

Europe U18 / U17 Championship
 Champions   Runners up   Third place   Fourth place

Team

Current squad
The following is the Dutch roster in the 2017 European U18 Championship.

Head coach:  Julien Van De Vyver

References

External links
Official website 

National women's under-18 volleyball teams
Volleyball
Volleyball in the Netherlands